Shuriken Sentai Ninninger is a 2015 Japanese television series, and is the 39th entry of the long-running Super Sentai series produced by Toei Company. Three generations had passed since Yoshitaka Igasaki, a man known as the Last Ninja, sealed the evil Yokai feudal lord Gengetsu Kibaoni. However, Yoshitaka's disgraced ex-disciple, Izayoi Kyuuemon, freed Gengetsu Kibaoni's spirit and revived his retainers. As only those of the Igasaki bloodline can stop the Kibiaoni Army, Tsumuji Igasaki has his children Takaharu and Fuka recruit their cousins Yakumo Kato, Nagi Matsuo, and Kasumi Momochi so the five grandchildren can be trained to use Shuriken Ninja Arts and fight the Yokai as Ninningers.

The series is directed by Shōjirō Nakazawa and written by Kento Shimoyama. It premiered on TV Asahi on February 22, 2015.


Episodes

Notes

References

External links
 for TV Asahi
 for Toei Company

Shuriken Sentai Ninninger